Esperanto and Interlingua are two planned languages with different approaches to the problem of providing an International auxiliary language (IAL). Esperanto has many more speakers; the number of speakers is  100,000-2,000,000. On the other hand, the number of speakers is  1,500 for Interlingua, but speakers of the language claim to be able to communicate easily with the  1 billion speakers of Romance languages, whereas Esperanto speakers can only communicate among each other.

Although they are both classed as IALs, the intellectual foundations of Esperanto and Interlingua are quite different. Despite divergent theory,  in practical terms, language usage in the two communities has sometimes shown convergences.  It has been argued that each language is a successful implementation of a different particular IAL model. However, in both language communities there is a polemical tradition of using external criteria to critique the other (e.g., judging Interlingua by Esperantist criteria and vice versa).

Overview of differences

Intellectual background 

One cannot ascribe a single outlook to all Esperantists or all Interlinguists; however, the contrasting views of L. L. Zamenhof and Alexander Gode remain influential among Esperantists and Interlinguists, respectively. Zamenhof, the inventor of Esperanto, was motivated by several strands of nineteenth-century idealism, ranging from Comtean positivism to utopian internationalism. Esperanto, in his view, was a theoretically neutral instrument for communication, which could serve as a vehicle for idealistic values, initially Zamenhof's philosophy of homaranismo, later the interna ideo (internal idea) of achieving "fraternity and justice among all people" (Zamenhof) through the adoption of Esperanto. Among later Esperantists, this philosophy has tended to reinforce a set of propositions about the language:

 Esperanto's European character is purely accidental; however, some features of Esperanto (and of some western languages) can be found  in non-Western ones.
 Esperanto is, ideally, the universal second language, replacing all other languages in inter-ethnic communication; pro-Esperanto arguments tend to assume a future situation of widespread Esperanto use in many situations where English is currently dominant.
 A tension exists between finvenkismo, predicting a 'final victory' (fina venko) of Esperanto, and Raŭmismo, which considers the 'final victory' too remote a goal.
 Esperanto is a vehicle for a specific internationalist and humanitarian ideology.
 Cultivation of an internal Esperanto culture is an important value for many Esperantists.

By the mid-twentieth century, when Gode led the development of Interlingua, the ideals underlying Esperanto had come to seem naive. Influenced by Herder, Gode propounded a Romantic, anti-positivist view of language: languages are an aspect of the culture of a people, not an instrument to achieve a goal; an ideology cannot be attached to a language, except artificially. This implied, in his view, that a world language on the Esperanto model was either impossible or, worse, achievable only through totalitarian coercion. He was of the opinion that, unless imposed by force, a universal global language would presuppose a universal global culture, which does not currently exist and is not necessarily desirable.

On the other hand, Gode saw another sort of international language—non-universal and non-culturally neutral—as being entirely possible.

Learnability versus comprehensibility 
Esperanto and Interlingua are fundamentally different in their purposes. Whereas Esperanto is meant to be an international second language able to be fluently learned by speakers of any language, Interlingua is directed more toward European languages, especially its control languages. Though Esperanto may be more neutral as well as easier to master, Esperantists can usually communicate only with other Esperantists, though the language is at least somewhat comprehensible to many who have not studied it; Interlingua, however, is intended to be understood to some extent by a speaker of any Romance language, because many words in Interlingua resemble their originals in Latin, the precursor to all Romance languages.

Vocabulary 

The vocabulary of both languages is taken largely from Romance, Germanic and Slavic languages; most of these words are derived from Latin. Depending on their international form, Germanic and Slavic words in Interlingua may be Latinized; for example, English blockade, German Blockade, Russian блокада → Interlingua blocada. By comparison, all words in Esperanto take on a characteristic Esperanto form. In this case, the Interlingua blocada and the Esperanto blokado are nearly identical and equally neutral.

Though both Esperanto and Interlingua borrow primarily from European languages, they also borrow words from other languages which have become widespread. Two different philosophies have led to two different approaches. Interlingua highly regards etymological fidelity, thus it usually adopts the word that is the nearest common ancestor of the respective words in at least three source language units (considering Spanish and Portuguese together as one unit). Esperanto highly regards regularity, thus it disregards the form of the word in European languages to make it match Esperanto's morphology and phonemic orthography. For example, Interlingua has geisha (from Japanese 芸者), sheik (from Arabic شيخ), and kayak (from Inuit ᖃᔭᖅ); in Esperanto, these words are written gejŝo, ŝejko, and kajako.

 
In Esperanto, to form a new word, it is generally preferred to compound two or more existing roots than to borrow a word from another language. This is recommended in order to keep the number of "primitive" roots low and thus to maintain its learnability. Interlingua does not have that as a design aim, thus most of its compound and "primitive" (non-compound) words also exist in its source languages.

Morphology 
Both languages have a highly regular grammar without difficult conjugations or declensions. Some parts of grammar may be considered simpler in Esperanto, while others may be considered simpler in Interlingua. Adjective morphology is simpler in Interlingua because it lacks any declension; noun morphology is also easier since it lacks an accusative form.  

Interlingua draws its roots from certain "control languages": French, Italian, Spanish, Portuguese, English, German and Russian. It uses these languages as a means to select the words most used in these major European languages. Esperanto draws from largely the same languages, but uses agglutination more extensively. Rather than using an existing word commonly used among the major European languages, Esperanto forms its own words using its own roots. For example, the Esperanto word for "hospital" is mal·san·ul·ej·o, which breaks down into five roots: mal (opposite), san (health), ul (person), ej (place), o (noun). It is notable to mention, however, that there also exist naturalistic forms of many words, in this case "hospitalo".

Interlingua tends to use words derived from natural languages instead of extensive agglutination. Despite this, Interlingua features a very concise system for synthesising new words through derivation when it is deemed necessary or practical. Highly agglutinated constructions are greatly frowned upon by Interlinguists, as the regular form of the word (i.e. "hospital") is far more understandable to most people.

The following table illustrates the difference between Esperanto and Interlingua with regards to word formation:

To the reader who speaks English or a Romance language, the words in the Interlingua column are more likely to appear recognizable. However, speakers of languages that do not have words related to the preferred words in the Interlingua column must preferably learn the Interlingua words one at a time. Esperanto, on the other hand, prefers agglutinating words from various roots, making it possible to derive words only knowing a limited list of roots. The same is theoretically possible in Interlingua, and the addition of one or two affixes to a common word is frequently done colloquially in the Interlingua community. Knowing the naturally evolved words is however vastly preferred, particularly in elementary cases such as the above. This point underlines the fundamental differences between Esperanto and Interlingua: the latter was designed to be easily understood by speakers of most Western European languages, whereas the former was designed for people to learn to speak more easily. Word derivation in Interlingua, however, is more regular than many natural languages.

Often, the European words on which Interlingua is based gain extensive currency in non-Western languages. Hospital, for example, appears in Indo-European languages as well as other major languages such as Indonesian, Tagalog, Swahili, Papiamento, and Basque. In many other languages, however, the word hospital is not found, including Finnish, Arabic, Hebrew, Vietnamese and Hungarian.

Both languages attempt to be as precise as possible; that is, each strives to reflect differences in meaning using different words. The Esperanto compound mal-san-ul-ej-o, literally "un-healthy-person-place-noun", implies a place for people who are unhealthy. The word means "hospital", but the compound could be construed as any place where an unhealthy person is. Interlingua's non-compound word, though possibly less neutral, thus avoids any misunderstanding. (Depending on the speaker and audience, Esperanto could also use a different word for "hospital", such as hospitalo, kliniko, lazareto, preventorio or sanatorio.)

Interlingua and Esperanto have minor differences regarding precisely how agglutinations occur. For example, Interlingua adds tense endings to the indicative form of a verb (dona → donar), while Esperanto adds them to the stem (don- → doni).

Orthography
The orthography of Esperanto is inspired by the Latin alphabets of Slavic languages, and is almost completely phonemic (one sound, one letter). Interlingua, by contrast, uses an orthography established by its Romance, Germanic, and Slavic source languages. Thus, the orthography of Interlingua is much more broad-based but much less regular than that of Esperanto. The procedure used sometimes favored English and the Romance languages, however, resulting in less phonemicity and more familiarity to speakers of those languages.

For example, the Esperanto kontakto and the Interlingua contacto mean the same thing and are pronounced the same, but are written differently because the orthography of Esperanto is simpler: one sound, one letter. Interlingua occasionally departs from this rule, chiefly because the letters "c" and "g" have hard and soft sounds. Such details make Interlingua more difficult to learn and speak for those who do not know any Romance language, but at the same time may appear more familiar for speakers of Romance or Romance-influenced languages.

Diacritics
Unlike Interlingua, Esperanto uses diacritics. 6 letters (ĉ, ĝ, ĥ, ĵ, ŝ, ŭ) have different pronunciations from their unmarked counterparts (c, g, h, j, s, u). Since they are not treated as mere variations, but as completely different letters, this makes Esperanto a phonemic language.   

Esperanto diacritics may be more difficult (or even impossible) to be reproduced by some typing systems that do not recognize its Unicode characters. Historical examples include standard typewriters and older computers; more recent examples include some text editors. In some cases, setup tweaks may be required to enable all letters with diacritics used in Esperanto. 

For cases in which its diacritics cannot be typed, Esperanto has two alternative orthographic systems that replace its letters with diacritics: the H-system, devised by Zamenhoff, and the X-system, devised by more recent Esperantists. They replace the diacritics by a subsequent H or X, respectively; for example, ĉ would be spelled ch in the H-system and cx in the X-system. There is some debate among Esperantists about which system is preferable to use; some argue that only the H-system is legitimate because it was created by Zamenhoff in Fundamento de Esperanto and also looks more natural, while others prefer the X-system because the H already exists in Esperanto, which makes the H-system subject to ambiguity.

Expressiveness
Supporters of Interlingua note that their language not only conserves the natural aspect of Western languages, but also their rich, subtle treasury of meanings. Interlingua flows regularly from its Romance, Germanic, and Slavic source languages, and thus it possesses their expressiveness.

Esperanto supporters contend that, by its liberal use of affixes and its flexible word-order, is equally as expressive as Interlingua or indeed any natural language, but is more internationally neutral. While acknowledging that the basis of Esperanto is a product of rational construction, not historical evolution, they argue that, after the prolonged usage of more than 100 years, it too has become a living human language. This historical evolution is shown by the growth of the number of Esperanto word roots, around 920 in 1887 and more than 15,000 in 1970.

Number of speakers
Although no census has ever been undertaken, Esperanto speakers frequently place their numbers at somewhere between 100,000 and 3 million speakers. The number of Interlingua speakers is generally estimated between a few hundred and 1,500. Esperanto is the only constructed language with native speakers, numbering 200-2000 according to Ethnologue.

Sample text: the Lord's Prayer

See also

Interlingua
Comparison between Esperanto and Ido
Comparison between Esperanto and Novial
Comparison between Ido and Interlingua
Esperanto

References

External links
Official site of Universala Esperanto-Asocio (UEA)
Official site of Union Mundial pro Interlingua
 Comparison at the Conlang Atlas of Language Structures.
 Comparison of basic vocabulary, EVOLAEMP project, University of Tübingen.

Esperanto
Interlingua
Comparison of constructed languages